Mirchi is a 2013 Indian Telugu-language action drama film written and directed by debutante Koratala Siva, and produced by UV Creations. The film stars Prabhas, Anushka Shetty and Richa Gangopadhyay with Sathyaraj, Nadhiya, Sampath Raj, Adithya Menon, Subbaraju and Brahmanandam featuring in supporting roles. The film was tentatively titled Vaaradhi, but was later renamed as Mirchi. Mirchi was one of the highest grossing Telugu films of the year 2013.

The film has received six state Nandi Awards, including Nandi Award for Best Feature Film (Gold), and Nandi Award for Best First Film of a Director for 2013. Kailash Kher won Filmfare Award for Best Male Playback Singer – Telugu, and Nandi Award for Best Male Playback Singer for the song Pandagala Digivacchavu. It was remade in Kannada as Maanikya (2014), in Bengali as Bindaas (2014) and in Odia as Biswanath (2022).

Plot
In Milan, Italy, a girl runs into Jai, a keyboardist, and asks him to save her from a gang of goons chasing her. Jai, without fighting, resolves the conflict. The girl introduces herself as Manasa. They slowly become friends, but one day, Manasa asks Jai to leave her as she cannot stand the separation from him, because of her family restrictions, if their relationship develops any further. Jai then returns to India and changes the mind of Manasa's violent brother Poorna. Poorna invites Jai to his village for vacation. There, where everyone is violent and conservative in nature, Jai changes their nature, except Uma's, and makes them more lovable. Manasa's family expresses their wish to marry her to Jai. When Manasa expresses her love for Jai, he tells about his past.

Jai was born to Manasa family's rival family. When Jai was a child, his father Deva wanted to reform the people of his village from unnecessary violence, but his mother Latha did not want to stay there, so she left him with Jai. Many years later, Jai became a successful businessman and runs a leading construction company. When Jai learns about his family, he visits them. He falls in love with family friend Vennela, who lives with Jai's family as a joint family . Manasa's uncle was threatening Deva to give him some land, but when Deva refused, they criticized him, which Jai did not appreciate. Because of this, he started taking revenge on Manasa's family without revealing his identity. When a marriage proposal comes for Vennela, she calls Latha and tells her that she is in love with Jai and cannot live without him. So everyone decide to get them married. During the marriage, the police inspector tells Deva that the enmity is rekindling because of Jai. Soon afterwards, the rivals come and Jai starts killing them. During fight, Latha dies. Deva banishes Jai and blames her death on him.

In present-day, Uma challenges Jai that if he can try his way of violence and defeat his men, then Uma too would follow Jai's way of non-violence. After successfully defeating them, Uma asks Jai if he could defeat the rival's son, not knowing that it was Jai himself, and that he would marry Manasa to Jai. Jai gets angry at his stubbornness and reveals his true identity as Deva's son. Uma starts fighting with Jai and wants to kill him. Jai fights back and speaks about how enmity would never end if both the sides fight and peace is the only solution. All of Manasa's family members come forward and asks him to consider how Jai changed their family. Uma changes once the disabled Manasa's father gains ability to speak to proclaims that Jai should live. This was watched by Deva, who had just arrived there. Deva asks for Jai's forgiveness for banishing him and welcomes him back to the family. Jai reunites with Vennela, encouraged by Manasa.

Cast

Production

Casting
Finalized the casting of the film with two heroines Anushka and Richa Gangopadhyay. The father and mother characters in the film are being played by Tamil actors Sathyaraj and Nadhiya.

Filming
Principal photography for the film began on 1 December 2011 at S. V. P. National Police Academy establishment in Hyderabad. Filming resumed on 16 January 2012 at a house set at Kokapet on the outskirts of Hyderabad. The set was built and previously used for S. S. Rajamouli's Maryada Ramanna. The filming continued till end of January with action Sequences for climax episodes were canned. After one month, filming resumed at Saradhi Studios in Hyderabad. Director canned few scenes involving Supreeth, Kota Srinivasa Rao and Prabhas.
In March 2012, filming was done at Ramoji Film City with lead actors. Filming resumed from 17 May in RFC where action sequences were canned on a railway station set. A new schedule began from 17 June in Hyderabad where important scenes on lead actors were shot. After the schedule, filming resumed in Pollachi where scenes on Prabhas, Anushka and Richa were canned. It was reported that the unit would move to Italy to shoot few songs on the lead actors. The film completed its Europe schedule on 14 October, where couple of songs were shot. The unit members of the film shifted to Tenkasi for shooting action scenes on 24 October. The next schedule of the film was progressed at Ramoji Film City picturising a song "Suno Senorita" on Prabhas and Richa Gangopadhyay. The Small Schedule of the movie was canned at Kutralam in Tamil Nadu on Prabhas, Anushka Shetty and on few lead Cast members. Ramajogayya Sastry visited the shooting spot of Mirchi at Annapurna Studios where a song was canned on Prabhas and Anushka Shetty with Dance Master Prem Rakshith. The visual effects of the movie was done by Light Line Entertainments in which a foreign location was creatively visualised.

Soundtrack

Devi Sri Prasad composed the Music for this film. The audio launch was held on 5 January 2013 at Ramanaidu Studios in Nanakramguda at Hyderabad. Krishnam Raju attended the audio launch function as chief guest, released the audio CD and handed over the first piece to Rajamouli. Dil Raju, Shyam Prasad Reddy released the trailers on this occasion.

Reception

AP Herald gave a review stating "Devi Sri Prasad started this year giving chart-buster songs to music lovers, this album surely stands as one of the best audio in Prabhas films."

Release

Mirchi received an A (adults only) classification from the CBFC which was initially willing to give the film a U/A (parental guidance) classification with 2-3 cuts, but the makers accepted the A certificate in order to avoid cuts. The movie released worldwide on 8 February 2013 amidst high expectations as it is the biggest outing of Prabhas. Great India Films is releasing Mirchi in 176 centers from 7 February in USA alone, which is by far one of the best and humongous release. The movie has beaten the record of Seethamma Vakitlo Sirimalle Chettu (SVSC) and Naayak, which had released in 69 and 54 screens, respectively, in the country. Mirchi is coming up with all digital screening in USA to ensure that it will have superb quality screens across USA.

Pre-release revenues
Mirchi overseas rights sold to a leading distribution company Great India Films, USA. Some information is that Mirchi overseas rights sold for  2 Crores to Great India Films.

Marketing
On 21 October 2012 the First Look posters and photos was released to the market in the view of the Prabhas Birthday on 23 October. Mirchi movie teaser was scheduled for launch on 18 November 2012. The first teaser of Mirchi movie was released in YouTube on 18 November 2012. The teaser got viral response across web and it has raised the expectations among the fans and movie buffs.

Reception

Critical reception
Jalapathy Gudelli gave the film 3.25 stars out of 5, concluding his review that "Mirchi showcases Prabhas in different avatar. Neat package of masala moments and Prabhas are the strengths. Mirchi is a decent entertainer and time pass flick". Jeevi gave a rating of 3.25 out of 5, commenting that "First half of Mirchi is decent. Flashback episode which occupies 100% of second half is good. Climax could have been better. The plus points of the film are Prabhas, music and all-round orientation. On a whole, Mirchi has all the ingredients of a commercial potboiler". Mahesh S Koneru gave his verdict that "At the Box Office, the film will turn in a good commercial performance", giving the film a score of 3.25/5. Way2movies also gave a rating of 3.25/5, giving the verdict that "Prabhas rocks the show in this decent yet formulaic commercial entertainer". Super good movies gave the film 3 stars in a scale of 5, reviewing that "Go and Watch Mirchi, It entertains both Class and Mass. It is a worth watch".

In the contrary, The Times of India gave the film a revised rating of 3.5/5 (from 2.5/5), recommending the film, "Watch it for Prabhas, for there isn't much of anything else that this movie has to offer, besides extreme close-ups of Richa's waistline." NDTV Movies gave the film a mixed review, stating that "apart from good direction and strong performances by lead actors, Mirchi lacks narrative power and is loosely based on an amalgamation of some old films, which makes the film quite predictable."

Box Office 
The film had a 30 crore budget and collected 80 crores at the worldwide box officeand the distributor share of 47.85 crores and declared as Blockbuster at the Box Office

Accolades

Remakes
John Abraham, actor turned producer has acquired the Hindi remake rights of Mirchi from the makers. John told PTI, "I saw the film and loved it a lot. We have bought the rights of the film and are quite excited to remake it here in Hindi. I would be acting in the film too. The cast and crew members are not yet finalized." From South, Kannada actor, director and producer Sudeep directed and acted in the Kannada remake of Mirchi. The film was named as Maanikya (2014). Sudeep roped V. Ravichandran for an important role in the remake. It was remade in Bengali as Bindaas (2014) with Dev, Srabanti and Sayantika.

References

External links

2013 films
MIRCHI
Telugu films remade in other languages
2013 masala films
2013 action comedy films
Indian action drama films
Films scored by Devi Sri Prasad
Films about violence
Films shot at Ramoji Film City
2010s Telugu-language films
Films shot in Italy
Films set in Andhra Pradesh
2013 directorial debut films
Films directed by Koratala Siva
Films shot in Andhra Pradesh
UV Creations films